Eunjin Song clan is one of the Korean clans. Their Bon-gwan is in Nonsan, South Chungcheong Province. According to the research in 2015, the number of Eunjin Song clan was 226,050. Their founder was  who was a descendant of Song Ju eun.

See also 
 Korean clan names of foreign origin

References 

Korean clans
Eunjin Song clan